Bledsoe may refer to:

People 
Albert Taylor Bledsoe (1809–1877), American educator, attorney, author, and clergyman
Amanda Mays Bledsoe (born 1978), American politician
Amani Bledsoe (born 1998), American football player
Aubrey Kingsbury (born 1991), American soccer player
Ben Bledsoe (born 1982), American pop singer
Benjamin Franklin Bledsoe (1874–1938), American federal judge
Curtis Bledsoe (born 1957), former American football player
Drew Bledsoe (born 1972), former American football quarterback
Eric Bledsoe (born 1989), American basketball player
Jerry Bledsoe (born 1941), American author and journalist
Jesse Bledsoe (1776–1836), American politician
Joshuah Bledsoe (born 1997), American football player
Jules Bledsoe (1898–1943), African American singer
Lucy Jane Bledsoe (born 1957), American novelist and science writer
Neal Bledsoe (born 1981), Canadian actor
Samuel T. Bledsoe (1868–1939), American railroad executive
Tempestt Bledsoe (born 1973), American actress
Terry Bledsoe (1934–2015), Sportswriter and NFL executive
Tim Bledsoe (born 1953), American politician and college professor
William H. Bledsoe (1869–1936), American politician
Woody Bledsoe (1921–1995), American mathematician and computer scientist

Places 
Bledsoe, Kentucky
Bledsoe, Texas
Bledsoe County, Tennessee

See also 
Bledsoe's Station
Bledsoe's Missouri Battery